The 2016 season was Shanghai Greenland Shenhua's 13th season in the Chinese Super League and 54th overall in the Chinese top flight. They also competed in the Chinese FA Cup.

Squad

Reserve squad

On loan

Transfers

Winter

In:

  
 
 
 
 

Out:

Summer

In:

Out:

Competitions

Chinese Super League

Results summary

Results

Table

Chinese FA Cup

Squad statistics

Appearances and goals

|-
|colspan="14"|Players who away from the club on loan:
|-
|colspan="14"|Players who appeared for Shanghai Greenland Shenhua who left during the season:
|}

Goal scorers

Disciplinary Record

Notes

References

External links
Official Website

Shanghai Shenhua F.C. seasons
Shanghai Greenland Shenhua F.C.